

Klaus Uebe (1 May 1900 – 3 February 1968) was a Luftwaffe general and recipient of the Knight's Cross of the Iron Cross of Nazi Germany.

Awards

 German Cross in Gold on 29 December 1942 as Oberstleutnant im Generalstab with commanding general of the VIII. Flieger-Korps
 Knight's Cross of the Iron Cross on 9 June 1944 as Generalmajor and chief of the general staff of Luftflotte 1

References

Citations

Bibliography

 
 

1900 births
1968 deaths
People from Kamień Pomorski
People from the Province of Pomerania
German World War II pilots
Luftwaffe World War II generals
Commanders Crosses of the Order of Merit of the Federal Republic of Germany
Recipients of the Gold German Cross
Recipients of the Knight's Cross of the Iron Cross
German prisoners of war in World War II held by the United Kingdom
Major generals of the Luftwaffe